Ernst Savkovic (born 23 August 1953, in Heppenheim) is a former professional German footballer.

Savkovic made 50 appearances in the Bundesliga during his playing career.

References

External links 
 
 Profile at sports.de

1953 births
Living people
German people of Yugoslav descent
People from Bergstraße (district)
Sportspeople from Darmstadt (region)
German footballers
Association football defenders
Bundesliga players
2. Bundesliga players
Kickers Offenbach players
MSV Duisburg players
Borussia Dortmund players
Tennis Borussia Berlin players
Rot-Weiß Oberhausen players
Footballers from Hesse